Chumig Gyatsa is one of the 24 Buddhist Tantric places.

Chumig Gyatsa means 'Hundred Waters' in Tibetan. 
It is the local name for the pilgrimage site Muktinath, a sacred place both for Hindus as well as  the Buddhists, located at an altitude of 3,710 meters, at the foot of the Thorung La mountain pass (part of the  Himalayas), Mustang district, Nepal.

See also
 Gandaki River

External links
Backgrounds on Muktinath-Chumig Gyatsa 

Tibetan Buddhist places
Vajrayana
Rivers in Buddhism